Umbrella Girl, or The Umbrella Girl Fountain, is a 1996 fountain and sculpture in Schiller Park's Grace Highfield Memorial Garden, in Columbus, Ohio's German Village neighborhood, in the United States. The copper fountain and sandstone pool were designed by Joan Wobst and Phil Kientz, respectively.

History

The current fountain replaced one depicting Hebe, the goddess of youth, installed as a drinking fountain in 1872. This fountain was relocated to a pond during the 1920s, and an umbrella was added. The statue disappeared during the 1950s. Local residents, wanting to replace the original fountain and sculpture, resulting in the installation of the current structure in 1996. The statue is mysteriously draped in a red cloak each holiday season.

See also
 1996 in art

References

External links
 

1996 establishments in Ohio
1996 sculptures
Fountains in Ohio
German Village
Outdoor sculptures in Columbus, Ohio
Sculptures of children in the United States
Statues in Columbus, Ohio
Historic district contributing properties in Columbus, Ohio